Brian Thomas Smith (born May 13, 1977) is an American actor and comedian known for playing the dim-witted but kind-hearted Zack Johnson in The Big Bang Theory for nine seasons. He has also made other TV appearances on Fear Factor, Two and a Half Men, Happy Endings, The Neighborhood, 9-1-1: Lone Star, and United States of Al. On the big screen, Smith starred opposite Al Pacino and Annette Bening in Dan Fogelman's directoral debut film, Danny Collins. Other films Smith has starred in include Lethal Seduction, Babysplitters, The Wedding Party, and Concrete Blondes.

Early life
Smith has a younger brother, Greg, who participated with him on The Amazing Race 7.

Smith graduated from Central Missouri State University (he was also a member of the Sigma Phi Epsilon Fraternity) before moving to Los Angeles. He was a member of the sketch comedy troupe, The Exploding Pajamas.

Smith is of English, Welsh, Irish, German, Cherokee, and Ashkenazi-Jewish descent.

Career
Smith has appeared in over 100 commercials including Miller Lite, Pizza Hut, Burger King, State Farm, Lopez Tonight, Chevrolet, Carl's Jr., Coors Light, Budweiser, Taco Bell, DirecTV, Pop Chips, Buffalo Wild Wings, Honda,  Corona, Applebee's, DairyQueen, Audi, and Progressive Insurance.

In 2005, in markets outside of the United States, he starred in a Heineken beer commercial with Jennifer Aniston.

In 2005, Smith appeared on the reality television competition series The Amazing Race 7 with his brother, Greg. The two were involved in a car accident during the sixth leg that injured their cameraman. They were then eliminated on the subsequent leg during the sixth episode and placed sixth overall.

In 2006, Smith was cast as the lead in Dan Fogelman's half-hour comedy pilot The 12th Man.

In 2010, Smith joined the cast of comedy series The Big Bang Theory in a recurring role, portraying Penny's ingenuous ex-boyfriend, Zack Johnson. He continued to recur on the show until its 12th and final season in 2019 (S12E12 and S12E25).

In 2021, Smith was cast in a recurring role of the comedy series United States of Al, as Freddy, the new boyfriend of Vanessa, Riley's ex-wife.

Filmography

Film

Television

References

External links

1977 births
Living people
American male comedians
American male film actors
American male television actors
American people of English descent
American people of Irish descent
American people of Welsh descent
American people of German descent
American people of Cherokee descent
The Amazing Race (American TV series) contestants
Male actors from St. Louis
Jewish American male actors
University of Central Missouri alumni
Comedians from Missouri
21st-century American comedians
Jewish American male comedians